WOSO (1030 kHz) was a commercial AM radio station broadcasting an English-language talk radio format. Licensed to San Juan, Puerto Rico, it served the San Juan–Caguas–Guaynabo metropolitan area.  The station was owned by Sherman Broadcasting Corporation, with Sherman Wildman as president.  It featured local talk and information shows, a weekday tradio program and syndicated programming from CBS News Radio, ESPN Radio and Westwood One.

History
WOSO was launched on November 21, 1977.

WOSO was the only radio station in Puerto Rico that broadcast in English full-time, (AM 1190 WBMJ is a Christian radio station broadcasting in both English and Spanish.) until the K-LOVE station WCAD was launched in early 2019.

On October 21, 2014, after 37 years broadcasting on 1030 AM, WOSO signed off. The transmitter was vandalized and the Puerto Rico Electric Power Authority was forced to shut down the station. As of October 22, 2014, WOSO is silent. After an initial effort to revive the station as an online stream, nothing further has been heard.

Ownership
In 1993, Sherman Wildman purchased WOSO for a reported sale price of $1.2 million.

References

External links
FCC History Cards for WOSO
 (from the Internet Archive Wayback Machine)

News and talk radio stations in Puerto Rico
OSO
Radio stations established in 1977
Radio stations disestablished in 2014
1977 establishments in Puerto Rico
2014 disestablishments in Puerto Rico
OSO
Defunct radio stations in the United States